Gisela Francisca Pino Garrido (born 1 September 1992) is a Chilean footballer who plays as a midfielder for Colombian club Deportivo Cali and the Chile women's national team.

Career
After playing for Women's Championship club Colo-Colo, in 2022 she moved by first time outside Chile and joined Colombian club Deportivo Cali.

References

1992 births
Living people
Chilean women's footballers
Chile women's international footballers
Chilean expatriate women's footballers
Women's association football midfielders
Colo-Colo (women) footballers
Deportivo Cali (women) players
Expatriate women's footballers in Colombia
Chilean expatriate sportspeople in Colombia